Baglan Assembly constituency is one of the 288 Vidhan Sabha (legislative assembly) constituencies of Maharashtra state in western India.

Members of Legislative Assembly

1962: Pandit Dharma Sonawane-Indian National Congress
1967: Pandit Dharma Patil-Indian National Congress
1972: Mothabhau Gorakh Bhamre-Indian National Congress
1978: Pawar Laxman Totaram-Indian National Congress
1980: Pawar Laxman Totaram-Indian National Congress
1985: Gangurde Runja Punjaram-Indian Congress (Socialist)
1990: Ahire Lahanu Bala-Indian National Congress
1995: Dilip Manglu Borse -Independent   
1999: Ahire Shankar Daulat-Bharatiya Janata Party   
2004: Sanjay Kantilal Chavan -Independent 
2009: Umaji Manglu Borse -Bharatiya Janata Party
2014: Dipika Sanjay Chavan -Nationalist Congress Party
2019:Dilip Manglu Borse -Bharatiya Janata Party

See also
 Baglan
 List of constituencies of Maharashtra Vidhan Sabha

References

Assembly constituencies of Nashik district
Assembly constituencies of Maharashtra